is a railway station on the Kagoshima Main Line, operated by JR Kyushu in Kasuga, Fukuoka, Fukuoka Prefecture, Japan.

Lines

Layout
The station consists of two island platforms serving four tracks.

Adjacent stations

History
The station was opened by JR Kyushu on 11 March 1989 as an added station on the existing Kagoshima Main Line track.

Passenger statistics
In fiscal 2016, the station was used by an average of 4,656 passengers daily (boarding passengers only), and it ranked 45th among the busiest stations of JR Kyushu.

See also 
List of railway stations in Japan

References

External links
Kasuga (JR Kyushu)

Railway stations in Fukuoka Prefecture
Railway stations in Japan opened in 1989